Re Australian Education Union & Australian Nursing Federation; ex parte Victoria  is a High Court of Australia constitutional law case that involves the scope of the intergovernmental immunity doctrine in Australian constitutional law.

In the case, the High Court struck down a Commonwealth law on the grounds that it impaired the capacity of a state to function as an independent government, the first time that the Court has taken such action.

Background
Under a Commonwealth law, the Australian Industrial Relations Commission could refrain from hearing a dispute if it thought it could be handled in a state body. However, Victoria argued that the law was discriminatory because Victoria had abolished its state-based system, the only state to have done so.

Furthermore, there was the question of whether Commonwealth orders that applied to state employees would prevent the state from exercising their essential functions.

Judgment
In a joint judgment, the Court accepted the tests of discrimination and structural integrity as laid down in Melbourne Corporation v Commonwealth. In this case, no discrimination was found, but the court found that the law affected the structural integrity of the state.

As for discrimination, there were two issues to consider. Firstly, even though the purpose of the law was to discriminate against Victoria, that is not a factor to consider. Secondly, in its practical effect, it could apply to any state, as well as to any industrial employees.

As for the structural integrity argument, it is required that the law directs attention to aspects of a state's functions that are "critical to its capacity to function". Being able to determine minimum wages and working conditions of its employees, especially those in the higher levels of government, is critical to a state's capacity to function.

See also 
 Australian Education Union
 Australian constitutional law

References

Readings 
 Winterton, G. et al. Australian federal constitutional law: commentary and materials, 1999. LBC Information Services, Sydney.

High Court of Australia cases
1995 in Australian law
Australian constitutional law
Intergovernmental immunity in the Australian Constitution cases
1995 in case law